Cercopis is a genus of froghoppers belonging to the family Cercopidae.

Species include:
 Cercopis arcuata (Fieber, 1884)
 Cercopis intermedia (Kirschbaum, 1868)
 Cercopis sabaudiana (Lallemand, 1949inq.)
 Cercopis sanguinolenta (Scopoli, 1763)
 Cercopis vulnerata (Rossi, 1807)

References

External links 
 Fauna Europaea
 Biolib

Cercopidae
Auchenorrhyncha genera